Creaserinus gilpini, the Jefferson County crayfish, is a species of crayfish in the family Cambaridae. It is found in Arkansas and Louisiana.

The IUCN conservation status of Creaserinus gilpini is "NT", near threatened. The species may be considered threatened in the near future. The IUCN status was reviewed in 2010.

References

Further reading

 
 
 

Cambaridae
Crustaceans described in 1989
Taxa named by Horton H. Hobbs Jr.